Isaiah Miller Jr. (born November 9, 1998) is an American professional basketball player for the Salt Lake City Stars of the NBA G League. He played college basketball for the UNC Greensboro Spartans.

Early life and high school career
Miller was born in Newark, New Jersey but grew up in Covington, Georgia. He attended Eastside High School in Covington before transferring to Newton High School before his senior year. As a senior, Miller averaged 20 points, six rebounds and 3.1 steals per game in leading the team to a 28–2 record and Region 8-AAAAAA championship. He was named first team All-Region and All-County and honorable mention All-State. He committed to UNC Greensboro in May 2017.

College career
Miller served as a key reserve at point guard as a true freshman, playing in all 35 of the Spartans' games and was named to the Southern Conference All-Freshman team after averaging 8.3 points and 1.4 steals per game, which was 8th-best in the conference. He became UNC Greensboro's starting point guard during his sophomore year and averaged 15.2 points, 4.5 rebounds, 2.1 assists and conference-best 2.9 steals per game and was named first team All-SoCon. His 104 steals were the second most in school history and in the NCAA Division I for the 2018–19 season. As a junior, Miller was named first team All-SoCon, the conference Defensive Player of the Year and the Southern Conference Player of the Year. He averaged 17.8 points and 2.8 steals per game. Following the season, Miller entered the 2020 NBA draft but did not sign with an agent. On July 22, he announced he was returning for his senior season.

For the 2020–21 season, Miller repeated as the unanimous SoCon Player and Defensive Player of the Year.

Professional career

Iowa Wolves (2021–2022)
After going undrafted in the 2021 NBA draft, Miller joined the Minnesota Timberwolves for the 2021 NBA Summer League and on September 20, 2021, he signed with the Timberwolves. However, he was waived prior to the start of the season. On October 26, he signed an Exhibit 10 contract with the Iowa Wolves as an affiliate player.

Salt Lake City Stars (2022–present)
In May 2022, Miller was invited to participate in a free agent camp by the Utah Jazz. He subsequently made the Jazz Summer League roster.

On August 3, 2022, Miller signed an Exhibit 10 contract with the Portland Trail Blazers. He was waived prior to the start of the season.

On October 23, 2022, Miller joined the Salt Lake City Stars training camp roster.

Career statistics

College

|-
| style="text-align:left;"| 2017–18
| style="text-align:left;"| UNC Greensboro
| 35 || 0 || 16.3 || .544 || .111 || .623 || 3.1 || 1.5 || 1.4 || .1 || 8.3
|-
| style="text-align:left;"| 2018–19
| style="text-align:left;"| UNC Greensboro
| 36 || 20 || 27.8 || .513 || .282 || .556 || 4.5 || 2.1 || 2.9 || .3 || 15.2
|-
| style="text-align:left;"| 2019–20
| style="text-align:left;"| UNC Greensboro
| 32 || 32 || 28.4 || .423 || .237 || .537 || 5.0 || 3.1 || 2.8 || .2 || 17.8
|-
| style="text-align:left;"| 2020–21
| style="text-align:left;"| UNC Greensboro
| 29 || 28 || 30.8 || .463 || .208 || .624 || 6.8 || 4.0 || 2.6 || .3 || 19.2
|- class="sortbottom"
| style="text-align:center;" colspan="2"| Career
| 132 || 80 || 25.6 || .474 || .241 || .577 || 4.8 || 2.6 || 2.4 || .2 || 14.9

References

External links
UNC Greensboro Spartans bio

1998 births
Living people
21st-century African-American sportspeople
African-American basketball players
American men's basketball players
Basketball players from Georgia (U.S. state)
Basketball players from Newark, New Jersey
Iowa Wolves players
People from Covington, Georgia
Salt Lake City Stars players
Sportspeople from the Atlanta metropolitan area
UNC Greensboro Spartans men's basketball players